Trials & Tribulations is the first and only studio album by American hip hop group Poetic Hustla'z. It was released on November 11, 1997 via Mo Thugs/Relativity Records. Production was handled by Romeo Antonio, Touch Tone, Poetic Hustla'z, and Krayzie Bone, who also served as executive producer together with Layzie Bone. It features guest appearances from Flesh-n-Bone, Krayzie Bone, Layzie Bone, Potion and Wish Bone. The album peaked at number 96 on the US Billboard Top R&B/Hip-Hop Albums chart.

Along with singles, music videos were released for two songs: "Trials & Tribulations" and "Day & Night" featuring Layzie Bone. The video for Trials & Tribulations features a cameo appearance by Bizzy Bone.
The album is unavailable on iTunes.

Critical reception

The Source – "...If Bone Thugs-n-Harmony represent major league baseball's All-Star cast, their offshoot group, Poetic Hustla'z are entrenched somewhere in the upper minor leagues..."

Track listing

Personnel

Anthony "Tony Tone" Chappell – main artist, producer (tracks: 2, 9)
Richard "Mo! Hart" Drake – main artist, producer (tracks: 2, 9)
Ronald "Boogy Nikke" Poole – main artist, producer (tracks: 2, 9)
Stanley "Flesh-n-Bone" Howse – vocals (track 1)
Steven "Layzie Bone" Howse – vocals (track 3), executive producer
Dominique – vocals (tracks: 3, 8)
Charles "Wish Bone" Scruggs – vocals (track 4)
Nicole Stewart – vocals (tracks: 5, 11)
Annette Stewart – vocals (tracks: 5, 11)
Joe Brown, Jr. – performer (track 6), assistant engineering, assistant mixing
Anthony "Krayzie Bone" Henderson – vocals (track 7), producer (tracks: 1, 5-8, 10), executive producer
Ayasha Jones – additional vocals
Lalesa Jones – additional vocals
Jimmy Zavala – saxophone (track 7)
Romeo Antonio – piano (track 8), acoustic guitar (track 11), producer (track 3), co-producer (track 4)
Tony "Touch Tone" Issacs – producer (track 4), co-producer (track 3)
Erik Nordquist – recording (tracks: 1, 2), mixing
Mark "V" Myers – recording (tracks: 3-11)
Rod Mendoza – assistant engineering & assistant recording (tracks: 1-4, 6-8, 10, 11)
Brian "Big Bass" Gardner – mastering
David Bett – art direction
Randy Ronquillo – artwork, design
Chiu Liu – design
Peter Dokus – photography
Steve Lobel – A&R, management
Jhane Isaacs – stylist
Gregory Stamps – assistant engineering

Charts

References

External links

Mo Thugs albums
1997 debut albums
Poetic Hustla'z albums
Relativity Records albums